The 1976 Open Championship was the 105th Open Championship, played 7–10 July at Royal Birkdale Golf Club in Southport, England. Johnny Miller won his only Open championship, six strokes ahead of runners-up Seve Ballesteros and Jack Nicklaus. It was Miller's second and last major championship title; his first was the U.S. Open in 1973.

Ballesteros, age 19, was the 54-hole leader at 211 (−5), two strokes ahead of Miller. In the final round, he was seven over par after twelve holes, which included a triple-bogey at the eleventh. Ballesteros rallied on the final six holes, with three birdies and an eagle, to tie Nicklaus for second place.

Defending champion Tom Watson carded an 80 (+8) in the third round for 227 (+11) and missed the second cut by a stroke. U.S. Open champion Jerry Pate was level par after two rounds, but also missed the second cut with an 87 for  Masters winner Raymond Floyd finished in fourth at 286 (−2), a stroke behind Ballesteros and Nicklaus.
The championship is also well remembered for the one and only appearance of Maurice Flitcroft who posed as a professional to gain entry and carded a record 121 for his first round qualifier before being banned by the R&A.

Past champions in the field

Made both cuts

Source:

Missed the second cut

Source:

Missed the first cut

Round summaries

First round
Wednesday, 7 July 1976

Second round
Thursday, 8 July 1976

Amateurs: McEvoy (+12), Squires (+12), Powell (+14), Poxon (+14), McNally (+15), McLean (+17), Ridley (+22).

Third round
Friday, 9 July 1976

Source:

Final round
Saturday, 10 July 1976

Source:

Scorecard
Final round

Cumulative tournament scores, relative to par

Source:

References

External links
Royal Birkdale 1976 (Official site)
105th Open Championship - Royal Birkdale (European Tour)

The Open Championship
Golf tournaments in England
Open Championship
Open Championship
Open Championship